Allied Bombing may refer to:

Triple Entente bombing, allied World War I bomber attacks against Germany
Combined Bomber Offensive, several Anglo-American campaigns during World War II
Operation Gomorrah, a World War II mission in which the US and Great Britain bombed the same target during the day and at night
Allied bombing of Germany
Allied bombing of Rotterdam in World War II 
Allied bombing of Berlin in World War II
Round the Clock Bombing, a World War II episode of the Clash of Wings TV series regarding the Combined Bomber Offensive
Battle of Britain, with World War II bombings by the German and Italian allies
Invasion of Poland, with bombings by both Germany and when they joined the campaign, Russia
Desert Storm, which included a coalition which bombed Iraq during the Gulf War
Operation Unified Protector, with NATO bombing of Libya during the Arab Spring